Wilfrido María Guerrero (January 22, 1910 – April 28, 1995)  was a Filipino playwright, director, teacher and theater artist. 
He wrote over 100 plays, 41 of which have been published. His unpublished plays have either been broadcast on the radio or staged in various parts of the Philippines.

Guerrero's plays can be found in various anthologies: 13 Plays (first published in 1947), 8 Other Plays (1952), 7 More Plays (1962), 12 New Plays (1975), My Favorite 11 Plays (1976), 4 Latest Plays (1980), and Retribution and eight other selected plays (1990). Guerrero also published a family memoir, The Guerreros of Ermita (1988).

Guerrero taught and trained many notable figures in Philippine performing arts: Behn Cervantes, Celia Diaz-Laurel, Joy Virata, Tony Mabesa and Joonee Gamboa.

Biography

Guerrero was born in Ermita, Manila. He wrote his first play at the age of 14 in Spanish, entitled No Todo Es Risa. This play was produced at the Ateneo de Manila University when he was 15.

Guerrero later worked as a reporter and proofreader for La Vanguardia, a Spanish newspaper, and as a drama critic for the Manila Tribune. He also worked for some time in the Philippine film industry as a scriptwriter. He served as director of the Filipino Players from 1941 to 1947. In 1947 he was appointed as director of the Dramatic Club of the University of the Philippines despite not having a degree, and he held that position for sixteen years.

In 1962, he organized and directed the U.P. Mobile Theater, which traveled around the Philippines to give performances.
 
Several of Guerrero's plays have been translated into and produced in Chinese, Italian, Spanish, Tagalog, Visayan, Ilocano and Waray. Six of his plays have been produced abroad: Half an Hour in a Convent at the Pasadena Playhouse, California; Three Rats at the University of Kansas; Condemned in Oahu, Hawaii; One, Two, Three (premiere performance) at the University of Washington, Seattle; Wanted: A Chaperon at the University of Hawaii; and Conflict in Sydney, Australia.

He is the first Filipino to have a theater named after him within his lifetime, the Wilfrido Ma. Guerrero Theater of the University of the Philippines.

Childhood

Guerrero grew up in an affluent family. His father, Manuel Severino Guerrero, was renowned for having a “clinical eye” that could diagnose illness just by studying a person's outside appearance. His father's clientele included some of Manila's richest denizens: Brias Roxas, the Ayalas, Pardo de Taveras, the Zobels, the Roceses, the Osmeñas, the Alberts, et al. As a result, the young Wilfrido enjoyed a comfortable upbringing along with his brothers Renato, Edmundo, Lorenzo, and Manuel.	As indicative of their social status, the Guerrero children were forbidden to eat with their hands (a custom in certain households) and to converse in Tagalog. 
 
Guerrero was nearly seven when his father died. His father bequeathed the family their home at Plaza Ferguson, two cars (which his mother sold), and a Php10,000 life insurance payout. Five months after the funeral, the surviving family rented the first floor of the house belonging to his cousins, the Mossesgelds, for Php50.00. His mother in turn rented the Plaza Ferguson home to an American family to generate income.

Guerrero and his brothers attended high school at the Ateneo in Intramuros. They became choristers to receive free tuition, but this required their presence at Mass every day.  Even with their tuition exempt (Php60.00 per semester), they still needed money to purchase their textbooks.

Guerrero completed his first play, the one-act "No Todo Es Risa," during his second year of high school. He showed it to the late Father Juan Trinidad, S.J. (who at that time was translating the Bible into Tagalog), who decided to stage it for their Father Rector's (Fr. O’Brien) birthday.

By Wilfrido's third year at the Ateneo, he purportedly had his fill of hearing daily Mass. This emboldened him to approach Don Alejandro Roces Sr., a patient of his father and husband of a close friend of his mother. Having heard Guerrero's proposal in his office at the Manila Tribune, Don Alejandro readily agreed, thereby paying Guerrero's tuition for his last two years in high school and ostensibly freeing him from daily Mass.

Writing career

It was Guerrero's favorite aunt, Maria Araceli, who discovered his writing ability. When he was 12 or 13 she noticed him writing on scraps of paper and then hiding them inside his cabinet drawer.

After his aunt's death, Guerrero wrote some of his most popular comedies, "Movie Artists," "Basketball Fight," and "Wanted: A Chaperone."  He also made her the basis for the principal characters in "Forever" (Maria Teresa) and "Frustrations" (Maria Araceli). “Both women are like my aunt: imperious, strong-willed, wise, but also humane,” he wrote.

Awards
Guerrero received three national awards: the Rizal Pro-Patria Award in 1961, the Araw ng Maynila Award in 1969, and the Republic Cultural Heritage Award in 1972.

The U.P. Mobile Theater received two awards when he was director: The Citizen's Council for Mass Media Trophy (1966) and the Balagtas Award (1969).

In 1997, Guerrero was posthumously distinguished as a National Artist for Philippine Theatre.

See also
Jose Y. Dalisay Jr.
Severino Montano
Rene Villanueva

References

External links

Full Text: Half an Hour in a Convent by Wilfrido Ma. Guerrero

Filipino theatre directors
Filipino dramatists and playwrights
1911 births
1995 deaths
People from Ermita
Writers from Manila
National Artists of the Philippines
20th-century dramatists and playwrights
Burials at the Libingan ng mga Bayani
Wilfrido